Óengus mac Nad Froích (430-489)<ref>all dates per The Chronology of the Irish Annals, Daniel P. McCarthy</ref> was an Eoganachta and the first Christian King of Munster. He was the son of Nad Froich mac Cuirc by Faochan, a British lady (called daughter of the King of Britain). In Geoffrey Keating's History of Ireland Oengus is given a reign of 36 years which would place the start of his reign as early as 453.

Biography
He was baptized a Christian in the royal seat of Cashel by Saint Patrick himself and imposed a baptismal tax on the Christian converts of Munster for St. Patrick. It is mentioned that half of his numerous progeny were given into the church. St Patrick baptized him in blood by driving his crozier through the king's foot. The king became very devout and surrounded himself with clerics.

In 489 the battle of Cenn Losnada in Mag Fea was fought in which he was slain. His wife Eithni Uathach ingen Cremthainn, called "the hateful", was also killed. She was a member of the Uí Cheinnselaig sept of the Laigin. The victors included Iollann mac Dunlaing, and Oilill, his brother of the Uí Dúnlainge sept of Laigin, and Eochaidh Guinech of the Uí Bairrche sept of Laigin, and, according to the Annals of Tigernach,  Muirchertach Mac Ercae, the Ui Neill king of Ailech. Óengus' head was given to Iollan. The reference to Muirchertach Mac Ercae as king of Ailech is unique to the Annals of Tigernach. A second entry in the Annals of Ulster with reference to the battle mentions Mac Ercae as victor, without reference to Ailech. According to Cormac McSparron  the reference to Muirchertach Mac Ercae as king of Ailech in the Annals of Tigernach probably arises from an insertion made after 913. The reason for its insertion may have been an attempt to push the expansion of the Uí Neill and their taking of Aileach farther back into antiquity than was the case.

Óengus appears in the 9th-century literary text The Expulsion of the Déisi, in which he grants land to the wandering Déisi horde. The story is set in the time of Cormac mac Airt, who is said to have lived 200 years before Óengus. He also appears often in the varying vitae of St. Ciarán of Saigir as a major patron of the saint.Mary Jones Celtic Literature Collective http://www.maryjones.us/ctexts/kieran.html

Issue
He was the ancestor of three major septs of the Eóganacht including the Cashel, Arithir Cliach, and Glendamnach lines. 
Feidlimid mac Óengusa, King of Munster (ancestor of the Eóganacht Chaisil)
Eochaid mac Óengusa, King of Munster (ancestor of the Eóganacht Glendamnach and Airthir Cliach)
Dub-Gilcach mac Óengusso, Prince of Munster
Uichtdhealdh, Queen of Connacht (married Ailill Molt)
St. Kessog of Luss
St. Fáelán of Strathearn
Ousilla, according to legend the Queen of Kernow, AKA Isolde.

See also
 List of rulers who converted to Christianity
 List of converts to Christianity from paganism

References
Notes

BibliographyAnnals of the Four MastersAnnals of UlsterG.Keating, History of IrelandO'Keeffe, Book of MunsterEarly Christian Ireland'' by T. M. Charles-Edwards

External links
 
CELT: Corpus of Electronic Texts at University College Cork

Kings of Munster
489 deaths
5th-century Irish monarchs
Year of birth unknown
Converts to Christianity from pagan religions
430 births